Voyeur is a 2017 American documentary film directed by Myles Kane and Josh Koury and starring Gay Talese and Gerald Foos. It globally premiered as a Netflix Original documentary film in December 2017.

Synopsis
Journalism icon Gay Talese reports on Gerald Foos, the owner of a motel in Aurora, Colorado, who allegedly secretly watched his guests with the aid of specially designed ceiling vents, peering from an "observation platform" he built in the motel's attic.

Reception 
Critical reviews have been mostly positive. Rotten Tomatoes gives the film an 82% approval rating, based on 28 reviews with an average rating of 6.5/10. The website's critical consensus reads, "Absorbing, unpredictable, and overall compelling, Voyeur is a singularly unusual — and utterly memorable — documentary experience." Charles Bramesco wrote in Vulture, "Their documentary forms a sharp image of the thornier side to investigative journalism". Jordon Hoffman in Vanity Fair called it "a marvelous documentary" and said the film was "packed beyond vacancy with discussions of weighty topics like authorial intent, truth in journalism, and media manipulation." IndieWire had a more critical review, writing "Voyeur is so eager to tell a good story that it tells the wrong one".

References

External links
 Voyeur - Netflix Media Center
 

2017 films
2017 documentary films
American documentary films
2010s English-language films
Films about security and surveillance
Netflix original documentary films
Aurora, Colorado
Documentary films about Colorado
2010s American films